Gav Bazeh (also Romanized as Gāv Bāzeh; also known as Gobāzi) is a village in Pir Taj Rural District, Chang Almas District, Bijar County, Kurdistan Province, Iran. In the 2006 census, its population was 390 people, made up of 71 families. The village is populated by Azerbaijanis.

References 

Towns and villages in Bijar County
Azerbaijani settlements in Kurdistan Province